Shelley Morrison (born Rachel Mitrani; October 26, 1936 – December 1, 2019) was an American actress. Morrison was known for her role as maid Rosario Salazar in the NBC comedy Will & Grace, which she played from 1999 to 2006. She was also a regular performer on the sitcom The Flying Nun, playing Sister Sixto, a nun known mostly for mangling the English language, and she had a recurring role in the soap opera General Hospital in 1982. She was also the voice of Mrs. Portillo in the animated Disney show Handy Manny.

Early life
Morrison was born in the South Bronx, the only daughter of Sephardic Jewish parents. She was initially raised in the Bronx, New York before moving to Los Angeles, California when she was ten years old. Her mother, Hortense, was a homemaker, and her father, Maurice Mitrani, was a clothing manufacturer.

Career
Morrison studied acting at Los Angeles City College and landed early film roles in Divorce American Style and How to Save a Marriage and Ruin Your Life.

From 1965 to 1967, she appeared four times as an American Indian, Linda Little Trees, in the television series Laredo (in the episodes "Yahoo", "Jinx", "No Bugles, One Drum", and "Split the Difference.") In 1966 she played “Addie Moonercan” in the episode “Which Doctor” of Gunsmoke.  In 1967, she capitalized on her own experiences learning English to play the Puerto Rican nun Sister Sixto, who had trouble with English, in Sally Field's show The Flying Nun. She played this role until the show was cancelled in 1970. Morrison also appeared in the 1997 romantic comedy film Fools Rush In, starring Salma Hayek and Matthew Perry, as well as more dramatic films such as Blume in Love and Breezy (both 1973).

One of Morrison's notable roles was as the Salvadoran maid Rosario Inés Consuelo Yolanda Salazar on sitcom Will & Grace. She appeared in 64 episodes from 1999 to 2006 (as well as a brief cameo on the September 2016 Will & Grace webisode in support of Hillary Clinton's presidential campaign). The role originally was created for a brief one-episode appearance, but Rosario was so popular with viewers that she became a recurring character. In addition to sparring with her libertine and very spoiled employer Karen Walker (Megan Mullally), Rosario married Karen's gay friend Jack McFarland (Sean Hayes) to prevent her deportation.

Among approximately 25 film appearances and 200 television appearances, Morrison portrayed a maid or housekeeper on 32 separate occasions. Morrison had just informed her agent not to offer her any more "maid parts" when the call came for Will & Grace. In 2017, NBC revived Will & Grace for a new series of episodes. On August 3, 2017, co-creator Max Mutchnick announced to reporters that Morrison had been asked to reprise her role as Salazar on the show, but that she ultimately decided to retire completely from acting. Although her last official acting role was a voiceover in the 2012 animated film Foodfight!, her final appearance as an actress was the 2016 election-themed webisode of Will & Grace.

Death
Morrison died at Cedars-Sinai Medical Center in Los Angeles on December 1, 2019, as a result of heart failure after a brief illness. She was 83 years old.

Filmography

References

External links

1936 births
2019 deaths
20th-century American actresses
21st-century American actresses
21st-century American Jews
American film actresses
American television actresses
Actresses from New York City
American people of Spanish-Jewish descent
American Sephardic Jews
Jewish American actresses
Los Angeles City College alumni
People from the Bronx
People from Greater Los Angeles